Boğazkale District is a district of the Çorum Province of Turkey. Its seat is the town of Boğazkale. Its area is 264 km2, and its population is 3,584 (2022).

Composition
There is one municipality in Boğazkale District:
 Boğazkale

There are 13 villages in Boğazkale District:

 Çarşıcuma
 Emirler
 Evci
 Gölpınarlar
 Kadılıtürk
 Karakeçili
 Kaymaz
 Örenkaya
 Sarıçiçek
 Yanıcak
 Yazır
 Yenikadılı
 Yukarıfındıklı

References

Districts of Çorum Province